Tift County is a county located in the south central portion of the U.S. state of Georgia. As of the 2020 census, the population was 41,344. The county seat is Tifton.

Tift County comprises the Tifton, Georgia Micropolitan Statistical Area.

History
The county was created on August 17, 1905, and is named for Henry Harding Tift, who founded Tifton in 1872. Tift purchased about 65,000 acres of virgin pine timberland there in the Wiregrass Region of South Georgia, and established a sawmill and a village for his workers. Tift eventually expanded into turpentine and barrel-making operations, and turned his barren timberlands into farms for cotton, corn, livestock, fruit, tobacco, pecans and sweet potatoes. When the Georgia Southern and Florida Railway intersected the Brunswick and Western Railroad near Tift's mill in 1888, the settlement was connected to Atlanta and became a boom town. It was incorporated as Tifton by the Georgia Legislature in 1890.

Tift provided employment and financial growth opportunities for his flourishing market center by founding the Tifton Cotton Mill, the Bank of Tifton, and other types of businesses in which he had a leading interest. These included fruit growing, groceries and general merchandise, cottonseed oil, lumber, brick and stone, and several railroads, all essential for the development of a region. Tift also established a model farm north of town and donated a large parcel of acreage for an agricultural experiment station; these enterprises led eventually to the development of Abraham Baldwin College and the Coastal Plain Experiment Station in Tifton.

Tift's civic commitment was most evident in his donation of lands for churches (Methodist, Baptist, and Episcopal) and Fulwood Park, and in his decades of service as a city councilman and mayor. Through a variety of business and civic undertakings, Tift contributed significantly to the economic and social development of south central Georgia. Though a captain of industry, agriculture, and finance, he is best remembered for his civic service and generosity.

Tift County was created on August 17, 1905, by an act of the General Assembly. Because Georgia law in 1905 did not allow a new county to be named after a living person, the legislature voted to name Tift County after Nelson Tift of Albany, Georgia, who was an uncle of Henry Harding Tift.

In 2013, John Edward (Edd) Dorminey a native of Tifton, author and historian drafted resolutions and presented them to the Tifton and Tift County Commissions which were passed unanimously. Soon after with assistance from Representative Jay Roberts the Georgia House of Representatives and the Senate voted to approve the submitted resolution establishing the naming of Tift County after its rightful founder, Henry Harding Tift.

Geography

The western portion of Tift County, roughly west of Interstate 75, is located in the Little River sub-basin of the Suwannee River basin. The county's southeastern third, from north of Tifton heading southeast, is located in the Withlacoochee River sub-basin of the same Suwannee River basin. The northeastern portion of the Tift County, east of Chula, is located in the Alapaha River sub-basin of the same larger Suwannee River basin.

Major highways

  Interstate 75
  U.S. Route 41
  U.S. Route 82
  U.S. Route 319
  State Route 7
  State Route 35
  State Route 125
  State Route 401 (unsigned designation for I-75)
  State Route 520

Adjacent counties
 Irwin County (northeast)
 Berrien County (southeast)
 Cook County (south)
 Colquitt County (southwest)
 Worth County (west)
 Turner County (northwest)

Demographics

2000 census
As of the census of 2000, there were 38,407 people, 13,919 households, and 10,105 families living in the county.  The population density was 145 people per square mile (56/km2).  There were 15,411 housing units at an average density of 58 per square mile (22/km2).  The racial makeup of the county was 65.31% White, 28.02% Black or African American, 0.20% Native American, 0.98% Asian, 0.02% Pacific Islander, 4.59% from other races, and 0.88% from two or more races.  7.67% of the population were Hispanic or Latino of any race.

There were 13,919 households, out of which 35.40% had children under the age of 18 living with them, 51.40% were married couples living together, 16.90% had a female householder with no husband present, and 27.40% were non-families. 23.30% of all households were made up of individuals, and 9.00% had someone living alone who was 65 years of age or older.  The average household size was 2.65 and the average family size was 3.10.

In the county, the population was spread out, with 27.20% under the age of 18, 11.60% from 18 to 24, 28.40% from 25 to 44, 21.10% from 45 to 64, and 11.70% who were 65 years of age or older.  The median age was 33 years. For every 100 females there were 94.50 males.  For every 100 females age 18 and over, there were 91.50 males.

The median income for a household in the county was $32,616, and the median income for a family was $39,083. Males had a median income of $27,874 versus $20,997 for females. The per capita income for the county was $16,833.  About 15.50% of families and 19.90% of the population were below the poverty line, including 28.00% of those under age 18 and 14.60% of those age 65 or over.

2010 census
As of the 2010 United States Census, there were 40,118 people, 14,836 households, and 10,327 families living in the county. The racial makeup of the county was 61.4% white, 29.0% black or African American, 1.3% Asian, 0.2% American Indian, 6.5% from other races, and 1.6% from two or more races. Those of Hispanic or Latino origin made up 10.1% of the population. In terms of ancestry, 20.8% were American, 9.1% were Irish, and 7.1% were English.

Of the 14,836 households, 36.3% had children under the age of 18 living with them, 47.0% were married couples living together, 17.6% had a female householder with no husband present, 30.4% were non-families, and 25.6% of all households were made up of individuals. The average household size was 2.60 and the average family size was 3.12. The median age was 34.5 years.

The median income for a household in the county was $36,847 and the median income for a family was $45,376. Males had a median income of $35,423 versus $29,297 for females. The per capita income for the county was $18,394. About 16.9% of families and 22.8% of the population were below the poverty line, including 32.9% of those under age 18 and 14.4% of those age 65 or over.

2020 census

As of the 2020 United States census, there were 41,344 people, 15,144 households, and 10,703 families residing in the county.

Communities

Cities
 Omega
 Tifton
 Ty Ty

Census-designated places
 Phillipsburg
 Unionville

Unincorporated communities
 Brookfield
 Chula

Education

Tift County School District operates public schools.

Politics

See also

 National Register of Historic Places listings in Tift County, Georgia
List of counties in Georgia

References

External links
 Official County website

 
Georgia (U.S. state) counties
Populated places established in 1905
1905 establishments in Georgia (U.S. state)